The Browne Medals (also known as the Sir William Browne's Medals) are gold medals which since 1774 have been awarded for annual competitions in Latin and Greek poetry at the University of Cambridge.

Sir William Browne, who had been president of the College of Physicians, died in 1774. His will left an endowment to the university:

The endowment, invested as a trust fund called the Browne Fund, is still used to encourage classical study at the university.

List of winners

This list is incomplete. Many of the earlier names of this list have been drawn from Classical Turns. The winners of the prize are published in the Cambridge University Reporter.

References

 'The Browne Prize Medals', Bulletin of the History of Medicine Vol. XIX, No. 4, April 1946, pp. 433–49.

External links
 Cambridge University - Browne Medal - photographs of the Browne Medal
 1865 Browne Medal at the British Museum

British poetry awards
Awards and prizes of the University of Cambridge
1774 establishments in England